The Nepal Inclusive Trade Union Federation (NITUF) is a national trade union centre in Nepal.

National trade union centers of Nepal
International Trade Union Confederation
Trade unions established in 2006
2006 establishments in Nepal